Cogswell Tower is part of the Scotia Square Complex in downtown Halifax, Nova Scotia. G level is ground level for Barrington Street and connects to the lobby of the Delta Halifax, P1 enters into Scotia Square, and P3 level is ground level for Albemarle (formerly Market) Street. The building is connected to the Downtown Halifax Link system.

The Business Development Bank of Canada's Halifax branch is located here.

Other buildings in the Scotia Square Complex are Duke Tower, Barrington Tower, the CIBC Building, Brunswick Place and Barrington Place. Like all buildings in the complex it is managed by Crombie REIT.

Buildings and structures in Halifax, Nova Scotia